Fox Park is a neighborhood of St. Louis, Missouri.  The neighborhood borders are Jefferson Avenue to the east, Interstate 44 to the north, Gravois Avenue to the south and Nebraska Avenue to the west. Surrounding neighborhoods include the Gate District, Compton Heights, Tower Grove East, Benton Park West and McKinley Heights.

The neighborhood's most distinctive feature is St. Francis De Sales Catholic Church, located at the corner of Ohio Avenue and Gravois Avenue.  Its  steeple is visible for miles around and has lent the church the nickname of "The Cathedral of South Saint Louis".

Demographics

In 2020 the neighborhood's population was  48.9% Black, 41.4% White, 4.8% Hispanic or Latino, 5.4% Two or More Races, 2.9% Some Other Race, 1.3% Asian, and 0.1% Native American/Alaska Native.

References

External links
Fox Park site

Neighborhoods in St. Louis
German-American culture in St. Louis